Unbalanced growth is a natural path of economic development. Situations that countries are in at any one point in time reflect their previous investment decisions and development. Accordingly, at any point in time desirable investment programs that are not balanced investment packages may still advance welfare. Unbalanced investment can complement or correct existing imbalances. Once such an investment is made, a new imbalance is likely to appear, requiring further compensating investments. Therefore, growth need not take place in a balanced way. Supporters of the unbalanced growth doctrine include Albert O. Hirschman, Hans Singer, Paul Streeten, Marcus Fleming, Prof. Rostov and J. Sheehan.

Introduction 

Hirschman contends that deliberate unbalancing of the economy according to the strategy is the best method of development and if the economy is to be kept moving ahead, the task of development policy is to maintain tension, disproportions and disequilibrium. Balanced growth should not be the goal but rather the maintenance of existing imbalances, which can be seen from profit and losses. Therefore, the sequence that leads away from equilibrium is precisely an ideal pattern for development. Unequal development of various sectors often generates conditions for rapid development. More-developed industries provide undeveloped industries an incentive to grow. Hence, development of underdeveloped countries should be based on this strategy.

The path of unbalanced growth is described by three phases:

 Complementary
 Induced investment
 External economies

Singer believed that desirable investment programs always exist within a country that represent unbalanced investment to complement the existing imbalance. These investments create a new imbalance, requiring another balancing investment. One sector will always grow faster than another, so the need for unbalanced growth will continue as investments must complement existing imbalance. Hirschman states “If the economy is to be kept moving ahead, the task of development policy is to maintain tensions, disproportions and disequilibrium”. This situation exists for all societies, developed or underdeveloped.

Complementarity 

Complementarity is a situation where increased production of one good or service builds up demand for the second good or service. When the second product is privately produced, this demand will lead to imports or higher domestic production of the second product, as it will be in the interests of the producers to do so. Otherwise, the increased demand takes the form of political pressure. This is the case for such public services such as law and order, education, water and electricity that cannot reasonably be imported.

Induced investment 

Complementarity allows investment in one industry or sector to encourage investment in others. This concept of induced investment is like a multiplier, because  each investment triggers a series of subsequent events. Convergence occurs as the output of external economies diminishes at each step. Growth sequences tend to move towards convergence or divergence and the policy is usually concerned with preventing rapid convergence and promoting the possibility of divergence.

Backward and forward linkages 

Hirschman introduces the concept of backward and forward linkages. A forward linkage is created when investment in a particular project encourages investment in subsequent stages of production. A backward linkage is created when a project encourages investment in facilities that enable the project to succeed. Normally, projects create both forward and backward linkages. Investment should be made in those projects that have the greatest total number of linkages. Hirschman called the industries with greatest complementarities as the 'leading sectors'. Projects with many linkages will vary from country to country; knowledge about project linkages can be obtained through input and output studies.

Most underdeveloped economies are primarily agrarian. Agriculture is typically at a primitive stage and hence possesses few linkages, as most output goes for consumption or exports. Therefore, it is said that underdeveloped countries are lacking in interdependence and linkages.

An example of an industry that has excellent forward and backward linkages is the steel industry. Backward linkages include coal and iron ore mining. Forward linkages include items such as canned goods. While this industry has strong linkages, it is not a good leading sector. Any industry that has a high capital/output ratio and causes significant costs to other businesses has the potential to hurt the developing economy more than it helps it. A better leading sector would be the beer industry.

Linkages and last industries 

The development of an economy using the unbalanced method depends on the linkages between sectors. Hirschman suggests that the best strategy is induced industrialization. This type of development will create more backward and forward linkages and should be the first step taken.

Industries that transform semi-manufactured goods into goods needed by final demand are called "last industries" or "enclave import industries".

In underdeveloped countries, industrialization takes place through such industries, through plants that add final touches to unfinished imported products. Examples are metal fabricating industries, pharmaceutical laboratories and assembly and mixing plants. Such industries have many advantages, as they often require the smaller amounts of capital available in such economies and without having to rely on unreliable domestic producers. Therefore, underdeveloped countries set up such "last industries" first. These industries create long chains of backward linkages. Colombia, Brazil and Mexico are  examples of countries that followed this path.

Protection and subsidy of import-replacing industries should come, but at a later stage. The Last Industry Strategy has disadvantages. It can slow the creation of domestic production. Industrialists who have begun working with imports may not accept domestic alternative products that reduce demand for their output. Creating last industries first can create loyalty toward foreign products and distrust of domestic products and their quality. Banks may get used to extending credit for shorter, smaller capital requirements.

Disadvantages 

Disadvantages of the last industry strategy include inhibition of domestic production as domestic demand grows. This is because industrialists who work with imported material will often be hostile to the establishment of domestic industries, because domestic goods are of lower quality, the number of domestic suppliers is small, downstream competition may intensify once inputs are available domestically and competitors may be able to locate closer to the upstream suppliers.

Last/first may accustom domestic consumers to imported goods, making it harder for local producers to find customers. Further, financing may be easier for import-based business.

Further reading 

 Hirschman, Albert O. (1958). The Strategy of Economic Development. New Haven, Conn.: Yale University Press. 
 Streeten, Paul (1959) Unbalanced Growth, Oxford Economic Papers New Series, Vol. 11, No. 2 (Jun., 1959), pp. 167–190

Astuatio

References 

 Hirschman, Albert O. "The Strategy of Economic Development,"  in Agarwal, A.N. and Singh, S.P.(eds), Accelerating Investment in Developing Economies (London Oxford Press, 1969)
 Thirwall, A.P. Growth and Development: With special reference to developing economies (London: Macmillan Press ltd.., sixth edition. 1999), pp237–242.
 Scitovsky, Tibor. Papers on welfare and Growth (London George Allen and Unwin ltd..1965) Refer to 5th paper entitled "Growth – Balanced and Unbalanced".
 Nath, S.K., "Balanced Growth." in Livingstone (ed), Economic Policy for Development (Harmodworth, Middlesex: Penguin Books ltd. 1971)
 Han Singer, "The Concept of Balanced Growth and Economic Development; Theory and Facts," University of Texas Conference on Economic Development, April 1958.
 Paul Streeten, "Unbalanced Growth." Economic Integration, Sythoff, Leiden (Netherlands), 1961. Reprinted in A. N. Agarwala and S. P. Singh, (eds.), Accelerating Investment in Developing Economies (London: Oxford University Press, 1969).

Economic growth